Language input keys, which are usually found on Japanese and Korean keyboards, are keys designed to translate letters using an input method editor (IME). On non-Japanese or Korean keyboard layouts using an IME, these functions can usually be reproduced via hotkeys, though not always directly corresponding to the behavior of these keys.

Keys for Japanese Keyboards

The OADG 109A and older 109 keyboard layouts which are the standard for Microsoft Windows have five dedicated language input keys: 
 halfwidth/fullwidth/kanji (hankaku/zenkaku/kanji ) at the top left key of the keyboard;
 alphanumeric (eisū ), combined with non-language specific key ;
 non-conversion (muhenkan ), on the left of the space bar;
 conversion (henkan ), on the right of the space bar;

Apple keyboards designed for Mac OS X have two language input keys: alphanumeric and kana.

The keyboards for NEC PC-9800 series, which was dominant in Japan during the 1980s and early 1990s, have three language input keys: kana, NFER (no transfer, same as nonconversion), XFER (transfer, same as conversion).

For non-Japanese keyboards, the following shortcuts can be used for typing Japanese on English keyboard with Windows:
  switch between languages (IMEs)
  switch to Hiragana
  if in alphanumeric mode change to Hiragana, then switch to Katakana
  switch between full-width Hiragana ↔ full-width alphanumeric (romaji)
 (Grave Accent) switch between kana ↔ half-width alphanumeric (romaji)
 (Tilde) toggle kana/direct input
  no conversion, all previous characters are accepted "as is" (all propositions from IME are rejected)
  convert current word (last characters) to the first word in the list of proposals
  convert to the 2nd-6th word in the list
  convert selected word/characters to full-width hiragana (standard hiragana): ホワイト → ほわいと
  convert to full-width katakana (standard katakana): ほわいと → ホワイト
  convert to half-width katakana (katakana for specific purpose): ホワイト → ﾎﾜｲﾄ
  convert to full-width romaji, all-capitals, proper noun capitalization (latin script inside Japanese text): ホワイト → ｈｏｗａｉｔｏ → ＨＯＷＡＩＴＯ → Ｈｏｗａｉｔｏ
  convert to half-width romaji, all-capitals, proper noun capitalization (latin script like standard English): ホワイト → howaito → HOWAITO → Howaito

Half-width/Full-width/Kanji

 toggles between entering half-width or full-width characters (if 2 versions of same character exists), and also between IME on (for Japanese, see Kanji key) and off (for English, see Alphanumeric key). Prior Windows 98 and older systems, the key was only with Half-width/Full-width function.

Kanji
Used to switch between entering Japanese and English text. It is not found as a separate key in the modern Japanese 106/109-key keyboard layout. On the Common Building Block (CBB) Keyboard for Notebooks, as many 106/109-key keyboards, the Kanji key is located on the Half-width/Full-width key, and needs the key .
It is found as a separate key on the IBM PS/55 5576-001 keyboard. On the IBM PS/55 5576-002 keyboard, it is mapped to the left Alt key.

Alphanumeric
 toggles alphanumeric characters. In the Japanese 106/109-key layout, it is located on the Caps Lock key. Pressing Alphanumeric/Caps Lock key alone actually means alphanumeric function, a user has to press  key to get caps lock function.

Conversion
 is used to convert kana to kanji. The alt version of this key is also pronounced zenkōho (全候補), which means "all candidates", shows all input candidates.

Non-conversion
 specifies that the kana characters entered are not to be converted into kanji candidates.

Katakana/Hiragana/Rōmaji
 used to switch between hiragana or katakana characters. Microsoft IME).

Keys for Korean Keyboards

The standard keyboard layout for IBM PC compatibles of South Korea is almost identical to the U.S. layout, with some exceptions:

 Hangul characters are printed on the keys.
The backslash has the shape of the Won sign including system fonts such Gulim (굴림) and Malgun Gothic (맑은 고딕). Note that vertical bar  is also replaced as the broken bar  on some South Korean keyboards, but the broken bar in Unicode (U+00A6) is not inputted by most of Korean IMEs.
 Keyboards with a small  key and large "backwards-L" shaped  key are commonly used in South Korea.
 There are two additional keys:  Han/Yeong (or  HanYeong) and  Hanja (or  Hanja) keys. They do not exist as independent keys on some keyboards.

Han/Yeong (한/영)

It toggles between entering Korean (Hangul) and English (ISO basic Latin alphabet).

Many computer systems support alternative keys or key sequences for keyboards without the Han/Yeong key. It is absent from the keyboards of most portable computers in South Korea, where the right  key is used instead. On the right  key of these devices, only "한/영" (Han/Yeong) or both "한/영" (Han/Yeong) and Alt are printed.

Hanja (한자)
It converts Hangul to Chinese characters (hanja) or some special characters.

Many computer systems support alternative keys or key sequences for keyboards without the Hanja key. It is absent from the keyboards of most portable computers in South Korea, where the right  key is used instead. On the right  key of these devices, only "한자" (Hanja) or both "한자" (Hanja) and Ctrl are printed.

Notes and references

External links
Japanese keyboards
Korean keyboards
5576 Keyboard Series

Computer keys